Reflective Records is an independent San Francisco-based record label for electronic music, operated by Jonah Sharp and his wife. The first release was the Fluorescence 12" EP by Spacetime Continuum, which was released in August 1993 with an initial pressing of 500 copies.
In the mid-1990s, Reflective's releases were known for featuring holograms on the CD or record cover, as well as on the label in the middle of the record.

Artists that have released on Reflective:
 Blaktronics
 Kid Spatula (real name: Mike Paradinas, also known as μ-ziq)
 Me-Sheen
 MLO (members: Jonathon Tye and Peter Smith)
 Move D (real name: David Moufang)
 Single Cell Orchestra (real name: Miguel Angelo Fierro)
 Spacetime Continuum (real name: Jonah Sharp)
 Subtropic (real name: Jake Smith)
 Velocette (real name: Jason Williams)
 Vulva (members: Tom Melchior and Tim Hutton)

See also 
 List of record labels

External links
 Official site
 Unofficial site

Record labels established in 1993
American independent record labels
Electronic music record labels